This is a list of fellows of the Royal Society elected in 1905.

Fellows
John George Adami (1862–1926)
William Arthur Bone (1871–1938)
John Edward Campbell (1862–1924)
William Henry Dines (1855–1927)
Sir Arthur Mostyn Field (1855–1950)
Sir Martin Onslow Forster (1872–1945)
Edwin Stephen Goodrich (1868–1946)
Sir Frederick Gowland Hopkins (1861–1947)
George William Lamplugh (1859–1926)
Ernest William MacBride (1866–1940)
Francis Wall Oliver (1864–1951)
Sir David Prain (1857–1944)
George Frederick Charles Searle (1864–1954)
Robert John Strutt 4th Baron Rayleigh (1875–1947)
Sir Edmund Taylor Whittaker (1873–1956)

Foreign members
 Ludimar Hermann  (1838–1914)
 Hendrik Antoon Lorentz  (1853–1928)
 Henri Moissan  (1852–1907)
 Hugo De Vries  (1848–1935)

References

1905
1905 in the United Kingdom
1905 in science